Salerno is a surname. Notable people with the surname include:

 Anthony Salerno (1911–1992), Italian-American mobster
 Enrico Maria Salerno (1926–1994), Italian actor
Fabio Salerno (born 1979), Italian Catholic priest and second secretary to the Pope
 Francesco Carmelo Salerno (1925–1998), Member of the Italian parliament and Football Club Manager 
 Joe Salerno (born 1981), American basketball coach
 Joseph P. Salerno (1914–1981), American architect
 Joseph T. Salerno (born 1950), Austrian School economist
 Nicola Salerno (1910–1969), Italian lyricist
 Randy Salerno (1963–2008), American news anchor
 Sabrina Salerno (born 1968), Italian singer, showgirl, model, actress and record producer
 Shane Salerno (born 1972), American screenwriter and producer
 Tony Salerno (born 1969), American voice actor

Italian-language surnames